Darbandi may refer to:

Places
 Darbandi, North Khorasan
 Darbandi, Razavi Khorasan
 Darbandi-ye Olya (disambiguation), two locations, Razavi Khorasan Province
 Darbandi-ye Sofla (disambiguation), two locations, Razavi Khorasan Province
 Darbandi-ye Vosta, Razavi Khorasan Province

People
Darbandi or al-Darbandi may also be a nisba, with the meaning "from Derbent". People with this nisba include:
House of Derbent or the Darbandids, ruling dynasty in Shirvan
Sheikh Bahlul Darbandi
Amir Tahmuras Darbandi
Fazel Darbandi, Qajar-era Iranian Shia cleric